Anna Vladimirovna Karpushina (born February 11, 1982) is a Russian wheelchair curler, 2020 World champion.

Master of Sports of Russia (2014).

She is the first World wheelchair curling champion from Saint Petersburg and the first wheelchair curler from Saint Petersburg in Russian national team.

Teams

References

External links 

Living people
1982 births
Curlers from Saint Petersburg
Russian female curlers
Russian wheelchair curlers
World wheelchair curling champions